Pokój  is a village in Namysłów County, Opole Voivodeship, in southern Poland. It is the seat of the gmina (administrative district) called Gmina Pokój.

History 

It was established in 1748 as a hunting lodge by Duke Charles Christian Erdmann, a scion of the House of Württemberg, whose ancestors had been enfeoffed with the Silesian Duchy of Oels in 1649. The adjacent settlement erected from 1763 with its streets radiating out from the ducal palace was modelled on and named after the Baden residence of Karlsruhe. When the Oels fiefdom fell to the Dukes of Brunswick-Wolfenbüttel in 1792, Charles Christian Erdmann's cousin Duke Eugen of Württemberg retained the town and palace of Carlsruhe as a fee tail. In the winter of 1806-07 he hosted the young composer Carl Maria von Weber, who wrote his two symphonies (Jähns 50/51) here. In 1847 Carlsruhe received the status of a spa town (Bad).

In 1871 Carlsruhe together with the Prussian Province of Silesia was incorporated into the German Empire. By the 1945 Potsdam Agreement the area fell to Poland (see Territorial changes of Poland after World War II).

The village was heavily bombarded during the end of World War II following the Vistula–Oder Offensive of the Red Army, and the palace was destroyed. The Baroque Sophia's Church finished in 1775 is preserved, as is the extended English garden laid out by the Württemberg dukes. An annual Carl Maria von Weber festival is held to commemorate the composer's stay.

Pokój's coat of arms shows the Württemberg three black antlers on the right, and the Upper Silesian eagle of the Dukes of Opole on the left side.

Notable people
Duke Paul Wilhelm of Württemberg (1797-1860), explorer
Duchess Maria Dorothea of Württemberg (1797-1855), Archduchess of Austria, Palatiness of Hungary
Duke William of Württemberg (1828–1896), Austrian and Württemberg General
Ferdinand von Richthofen (1833–1905), geographer
Duke Nicholas of Württemberg (1833–1903), Austrian officer 
Duchess Agnes of Württemberg (1835-1886), German aristocrat 
Siegfried Translateur (1875-1944), composer
Johannes Winkler (1897-1947), rocket pioneer

External links 
 Jewish Community in Pokój on Virtual Shtetl

References

Villages in Namysłów County
Palaces in Poland